This is a discography of Richard Wagner's opera Die Meistersinger von Nürnberg which received its premiere at the Königliches Hof- und National-Theater in Munich, on June 21, 1868.

List

References

Operadis discography (89 items), accessed 3 September 2010

Opera discographies
Meistersinger Discography